Emphreus adlbaueri is a species of beetle in the family Cerambycidae. It was described by Pierre Téocchi and Jérôme Sudre in 2009. It is known from South Africa.

References

Stenobiini
Beetles described in 2009